The 2021–22 CBA season was the 27th season of the Chinese Basketball Association (CBA). The regular season was reduced to 38 games for each team and was divided into three stages. The first stage, which was played in Zhuji, Zhejiang, began on 16 October 2021 and ended on 14 November 2021. The second stage, which was played in Changchun, Jilin, began on 25 December 2021 and ended on 28 January 2022. The third stage, which was played in Foshan, Guangdong and Shenyang, Liaoning, began on 1 March 2022 and ended on 22 March 2022. The playoffs, which were played in Nanchang, Jiangxi, began on 1 April 2022 and ended on 26 April 2022.

Transactions

Teams

Team changes
New team
 Ningbo Rockets

Draft
The 2021 CBA Draft, the seventh edition of the CBA draft, took place on 18 July 2021 in Qingdao, Shandong.

Foreign players
This is the full list of international players competing in the CBA during the 2021–22 season.

Regular season

League table

Results
The regular season was reduced to 38 games for each team. 20 teams will play against each other twice.

Playoffs

Bracket

First round

(5) Guangdong Southern Tigers vs. (12) Tianjin Pioneers

(6) Shenzhen Leopards vs. (11) Shandong Hi-Speed Kirin

(7) Beijing Ducks vs. (10) Jilin Northeast Tigers

(8) Guangzhou Loong Lions vs. (9) Shanxi Loongs

Quarter-finals

(1) Liaoning Flying Leopards vs. (9) Shanxi Loongs

(2) Zhejiang Lions vs. (10) Jilin Northeast Tigers

(3) Shanghai Sharks vs. (6) Shenzhen Leopards

(4) Zhejiang Golden Bulls vs. (5) Guangdong Southern Tigers

Semi-finals

(1) Liaoning Flying Leopards vs. (5) Guangdong Southern Tigers

(2) Zhejiang Lions vs. (3) Shanghai Sharks

Finals

(1) Liaoning Flying Leopards vs. (2) Zhejiang Lions

Final standings

All-Star Weekend
jeremy lin

Statistics

Awards

References

External links
CBA Official Website
CBA China - 2020-21 Standings and Stats on Basketball-Reference.com

League
Chinese Basketball Association seasons
CBA